Rezu Sofla (also Romanized as Reẕū Soflá; also known as Reẕū) is a village in Kakhk Rural District, Kakhk District, Gonabad County, Razavi Khorasan Province, Iran. At the 2006 census, its population was 57, in 18 families.

References 

Populated places in Gonabad County